Ghana competed at the 1996 Summer Olympics in Atlanta, United States. Boxer Tijani Moro, who won Ghana's only medal at the 1994 Commonwealth Games, carried his country's flag at the opening ceremony.

Results by event

Athletics

Men 

Track and road events

Field events

Women 

Track and road events

Boxing

Football

Men's Tournament 

Group stage - Group C

  

  

Quarterfinal

Team roster

Richard Kingson
Jacob Nettey
Nii Aryee Welbeck
Stephen Baidoo
Joe Addo
Afo Duodu
Samuel Kuffour
Mallam Yahaya
Augustine Ahinful
Charles Akonnor
Emmanuel Duah
Felix Aboagye
Kennedy Ohene
Ebenezer Hagan
Christian Sabah
Prince Amoako Koranteng
Emmanuel Osei Kuffour
Simon Addo

Table Tennis

Men's Singles Tournament 

Group stage - Group D

Men's Doubles Tournament 

Group stage - Group C

References
sports-reference

Nations at the 1996 Summer Olympics
1996 Summer Olympics
Olympics